Pan Ziqiang (1 June 1936 – 19 January 2022) was a Chinese engineer specializing in radiation protection and environmental protection, and an academician of the Chinese Academy of Engineering.

Life and career 
Pan was born in Yiyang, Hunan, on 1 June 1936. In 1953, he was admitted to Peking University, majoring in the Physics Department. After graduating in 1957, he was despatched to the China National Nuclear Corporation, where he worked successively as associate research fellow and research fellow. He joined the Chinese Communist Party (CCP) in 1978. He died in Beijing on 19 January 2022, at the age of 85.

Honours and awards 
 1997 Member of the Chinese Academy of Engineering (CAE)

References 

1936 births
2022 deaths
People from Yiyang
Engineers from Hunan
Peking University alumni
Members of the Chinese Academy of Engineering